The Tantrasara is a work attributed to Abhinavagupta, the most famous historical proponent of the Trika or Kashmir Shaivism philosophy of Hinduism.  It is said to be a condensed version of the Tantraloka, Abhinavagupta's masterpiece.

Citations

References

 Tantrasara by Abhinavagupta, English translation https://archive.org/details/TantrasaraByH.NChakravarty

Hindu tantra
Shaiva texts
Kashmir Shaivism